London Buses route 427 is a Transport for London contracted bus route in London, England. Running between Uxbridge station and Southall, it is operated by Abellio London.

History

The conversion of route 207 to articulated buses resulted in the route no longer being able to serve Uxbridge, due to tight turns in the town centre, so the route was split into two sections on 9 April 2005 with the western end between Uxbridge station and Acton renumbered 427, running from Acton (AT) garage using Dennis Trident 2s cascaded from route 207.

Transport for London were proposing to build the West London Tram between Shepherd's Bush and Uxbridge, running along Uxbridge Road. The tram would have replaced routes 207, 427 and 607. Transport for London claimed that trams would carry more passengers and be more reliable, but due to the Crossrail project going ahead the plans were scrapped.

Upon being re-tendered, First London commenced a new contract on 10 April 2010, with new Wright Eclipse Gemini 2 bodied Volvo B9TLs. From the same date the route was due to be extended to Acton Town Hall in place of the former Horn Lane terminus, which was eventually put in effect in January 2011.

On 22 June 2013, route 427 was included in the sale of First London's Hayes garage to Metroline.

On 8 April 2017, the route passed to Abellio London operating from Hayes garage. This contract was only for three rather the usual five years to allow Transport for London the option of restructuring services after the Elizabeth line opened. On 11 April 2020, Abellio London commenced a new contract.

On 4 March 2023, the section between Acton and Southall was withdrawn. The route was also extended from Southall Town Hall to Southall, Merrick Road via South Road and Southall Station on the same day.

References

External links

Bus routes in London
Transport in the London Borough of Ealing
Transport in the London Borough of Hillingdon